The interpretive center located in Pokagon State Park, Angola, Indiana, contains animals and displays about Pokagon and its surrounding areas. It is staffed by full-time and part-time naturalists. The Interpretive Center is the start of some interpretive hikes and the adjacent auditorium is the site of some programs.

External links
Pokagon Interpretive Center
Pokagon State Park

Nature centers in Indiana
Tourist attractions in Steuben County, Indiana
Education in Steuben County, Indiana
Buildings and structures in Steuben County, Indiana